Anna Margret Jönsson Haag (born 1 June 1986 as Anna Hansson) is a Swedish retired cross-country skier who competed between 2003 and 2018. At the Sochi 2014 Winter Olympics Haag won gold in the 4 × 5 km relay, earning Sweden the first gold medal in the women's relay event since 1960.

Career
Haag participated in her first FIS Nordic World Ski Championships 2009 in Liberec. She won a bronze medal in the 4 × 5 km relay event together with Lina Andersson, Britta Norgren and Charlotte Kalla.

Haag's best individual World Cup finish is a third place in a 10 km event 21 November 2009. Her lone victory was at a FIS race in Sweden in the 10 km event in 2008.

On 19 February 2010, Haag won the Olympic silver medal in the 15 km pursuit. Three days later, on 22 February, she won another silver medal, in the team sprint together with Charlotte Kalla.

At the Sochi 2014 Winter Olympics Haag in the 4 × 5 km relay, 3rd stage, won gold.

At the Pyeongchang 2018 Winter Olympics Haag won silver in the 4 × 5 km relay.

In March 2018, her retirement from cross–country skiing following the 2017–2018 season was announced.

Cross-country skiing results
All results are sourced from the International Ski Federation (FIS).

Olympic Games
 4 medals – (1 gold, 3 silver)

World Championships
 4 medals – (3 silver, 1 bronze)

World Cup

Season standings

Individual podiums
 1 victory – (1 )
 3 podiums – (2 , 1 )

Team podiums
 1 victory – (1 )
 5 podiums – (5 )

Personal life
Haag married fellow Swedish sprint specialist Emil Jönsson in 2018. They spend their time between Östersund, Sweden and Davos, Switzerland.

References

External links

  
 
 
 

1986 births
Living people
Swedish female cross-country skiers
Olympic cross-country skiers of Sweden
Olympic medalists in cross-country skiing
Olympic gold medalists for Sweden
Olympic silver medalists for Sweden
Cross-country skiers at the 2010 Winter Olympics
Cross-country skiers at the 2014 Winter Olympics
Cross-country skiers at the 2018 Winter Olympics
Medalists at the 2010 Winter Olympics
Medalists at the 2014 Winter Olympics
Medalists at the 2018 Winter Olympics
FIS Nordic World Ski Championships medalists in cross-country skiing
Tour de Ski skiers
IFK Mora skiers
People from Köping Municipality
21st-century Swedish women